Frederick Theodore Haneman (20 September 1862 – 3 May 1950) was an American author best known for being a contributor to the Jewish Encyclopedia.

Haneman lived and worked in Brooklyn, New York. While writing articles for the Jewish Encyclopedia, he was managing editor of The New York Medical Journal. He also wrote for the American Jewish Yearbook. He was a contributor to the New International Encyclopedia, on the subject of toxicology.

References
New York Herald Tribune, 4 May 1950, p 24.
Harold Fisher Wilson. "Frederick Theodore Haneman, M.D., D.D.S.". The Jersey Shore: A Social and Economic History of the Counties of Atlantic, Cape May, Monmouth, and Ocean. Lewis Historical Publishing Company. 1953. Volume 2. See pages 404 to 409. Google Books.
"Haneman, Frederick Theodore". Who Was Who in America. Marquis Who's Who. 1968. Volume 4. Page 402. Google Books.
Barbara McNeil. Abridged Biography and Genealogy Master Index. Gale Research Company. 1988. Google Books
The Athenæum, No 4032, 4 February 1905, p 144 Google Books
"Article on Poisonous Plants in the New International Encyclopedia" (1917) 12 American Journal of Veterinary Medicine 462 Google Books:   

Jewish American writers
1862 births
1950 deaths
American encyclopedists